Astronium is a genus of flowering plants in the cashew family, Anacardiaceae. It is native to Central and South America.

Astronium is a genus of dioecious trees. Leaves are deciduous, alternate, and odd-pinnate.

Species
, Plants of the World Online accepted the following species:
Astronium concinnum Schott
Astronium fraxinifolium Schott
Astronium gardneri Mattick
Astronium glaziovii Mattick
Astronium graveolens Jacq. (syn. Astronium conzattii S.F.Blake)
Astronium lecointei Ducke
Astronium mirandae F.A.Barkley
Astronium nelson-rosae Santin
Astronium obliquum Griseb.
Astronium pumilum J.D.Mitch. & Daly
Astronium ulei Mattick

Species formerly placed in this genus that are now placed in Myracrodruon include:
Astronium balansae Engl. → Myracrodruon balansae
Astronium urundeuva → Myracrodruon urundeuva

Fossil record
Fossils of an Astronium sp. have been described from the fossil flora of Kızılcahamam district in Turkey, which is of early Pliocene age.

References

Further reading

 
Anacardiaceae genera
Taxa named by Nikolaus Joseph von Jacquin
Dioecious plants